Madhukar Dighe (26 October 1920 – 28 July 2014) was an Indian politician who was the governor of Meghalaya from 10 May 1990 to 18 June 1995. Dighe was also the governor of Arunachal Pradesh in 1993, as an additional charge, and was earlier a cabinet minister in the Ram Naresh Yadav ministry from 1977 to 1979.

References

1920 births
2014 deaths
Governors of Meghalaya
Governors of Arunachal Pradesh
Members of the Uttar Pradesh Legislative Assembly
State cabinet ministers of Uttar Pradesh
People from Gorakhpur district
Janata Party politicians
Samajwadi Party politicians from Uttar Pradesh